The Edwards-Swayze House is a historic building located in Nevada, Iowa, United States.  Clayton F. Edwards, a local merchant, had this house built in 1878.  He sold the house to Emma Swayze, the wife of banker W.F. Swayze, in 1890 when he relocated to Kennard, Nebraska.  The house follows a vernacular form with elements of the Queen Anne style that were not fully integrated or carried though.  The 2½-story brick structure features an irregular plan, octagonal turret, hip roof, shingled gable ends, enclosed porches, and window hoods.  It was listed on the National Register of Historic Places in 1978.

References

Houses completed in 1878
Vernacular architecture in Iowa
Houses in Story County, Iowa
Houses on the National Register of Historic Places in Iowa
National Register of Historic Places in Story County, Iowa
Bed and breakfasts in Iowa